The Cachar Express was a daily Indian Railways metre-gauge overnight express train from  (nearest broad-gauge rail link of Silchar) to Silchar (second largest city of Assam) and vice versa, both stations are situated in the Indian state of Assam. The train was numbered as 15691 and 15692 respectively. The train service is suspended now as the route in which it used to run is now converted from metre gauge to broad gauge.

Information
Originally, these trains ran between Guwahati (capital of the state Assam) and Silchar but after conversion of metre-gauge line of Guwahati–Lumding to broad gauge, the originating and ending station of these train had changed. This train was the first option for the passengers, who were willing to travel by train between Silchar and Guwahati, as it was an overnight train. There was another train on that section, the Barak Valley Express; although this latter train was named Express, it used to run with a status of passenger train in its last days.

Cachar Express used to depart Lumding as 15691 at 20:15 and from Silchar as 15692 at 19:15. The train used to cover a distance of 212 km in 12 hours in its up and down journey with an average moving speed of 18 km/hr.

The train was hauled by the YDM-4 class of Lumding metre-gauge diesel loco shed locomotive. 15692 used to be  connected with two locos, one in front and another in the rear for pulling and pushing its way to the height of Barail Range, from Harangajao to Jatinga. It had a length of 11 coaches with all non-AC accommodation; SL (6) GN (3) SLR (2).

The train used to pass through 36 tunnels in Barail Range made during the British era. Now this entire route is converted to broad gauge.
The broad-gauge predecessor for this train is the 15944 Barak–Brahmaputra Express.

Major halts 
; Start
 Maibang
 Lower Haflong
 Haflong Hill
 Jatinga
 Old Harangajao
 
 
 
; End

References

Transport in Silchar
Transport in Guwahati
Defunct trains in India
Rail transport in Assam